Har Ki Doon or Har Ki Dun is a cradle-shaped hanging valley in the Garhwal Himalayas of Uttarakhand, India. The region is surrounded with green Bugyals (High Altitude Meadows). It is surrounded by snow-covered peaks and alpine vegetation. It is connected to Baspa Valley by the Borasu Pass.

This valley is about 3566 m (11700 ft) above mean sea level and is snow-covered from October to March.

References

External links
Google Earth view

Valleys of Uttarakhand
Hiking trails in Uttarakhand